The following is a schedule of the 2008 Democratic National Convention that was held from August 25 to August 27 at Pepsi Center and on August 28 at INVESCO Field at Mile High in Denver, Colorado.

Sunday, August 24

Interfaith gathering
A Democratic National Convention Interfaith Gathering was held at "2:00 pm MT, at the Wells Fargo Theater, inside the Colorado Convention Center." It was the first time the DNC has hosted such an event and was "the first official event for the 2008 Convention [...] The event [was] free and open to the public, but tickets [were] required."

The event was led by:
Rabbi Tsvi Weinreb, executive vice president of the Union of Orthodox Jewish Congregations of America
Bishop Charles E. Blake, presiding prelate of the Church of God in Christ
Ingrid Mattson, president of the Islamic Society of North America
Roman Catholic nun Helen Prejean, who was featured in the award-winning movie Dead Man Walking

Additional clergy included: 
Rabbi Marc Schneier, founding director of the Jewish-Muslim Foundation for Ethnic Understanding
Rabbi Amy Schwartzman, a Reform rabbi from Virginia.

Local clergy included:
Imam Abdur-Rahim Ali of the Northeast Denver Islamic Center
Rabbi Steven Foster from Congregation Emmanuel
Human rights leader Reverend Lucia Guzman
Kathryn Ida of the Buddhist Association at University of Colorado.

The Secular Coalition for America has argued that while the event was "designed to showcase the 'diversity' and 'shared values' of the party and achieve a 'spirit of unity,' it would, in fact, marginalize those Democrats who do not practice religion." The Coalition wrote to Chief executive officer of the Democratic National Convention Committee, the Rev. Leah Daughtry, stating that it "expressed the Coalition's willingness to discuss ways to make the convention more inclusive."

Monday, August 25

The theme for the day was "One Nation", with Michelle Obama as the "headline prime-time speaker." She was introduced by her brother, Craig Robinson. The Work to Come: A Tribute to Senator Edward Kennedy, directed and produced by Mark Herzog and Chris Cowen in association with Ken Burns, was introduced by Kennedy's niece, Caroline Kennedy. Senator Kennedy was not expected to attend the convention due to his illness, but nevertheless made a surprise appearance and speech in the evening. A video about former President Jimmy Carter's humanitarian work was also shown, followed by a brief appearance by the president and former President himself, accompanied by former First Lady Rosalynn Carter.

The Platform was adopted by voice vote with no real debate.

The speakers were scheduled to include:

Principal speakers
Caroline Bouvier Kennedy, author, attorney, and former First Daughter
Edward M. Kennedy, United States Senator from Massachusetts
Michelle Obama, attorney, public servant, and executive; wife of Barack Obama
Nancy Pelosi, Speaker of the United States House of Representatives, congresswoman, Convention Chair

Featured speakers
Joe Baca, United States Representative from California
Tom Balanoff, representative of the Illinois Service Employees International Union
Sherrod Brown, United States Senator from Ohio
Howard Dean, chair of the Democratic National Committee
Miguel del Valle, Chicago City Clerk
Manny Diaz, Mayor of Miami
Jesse Jackson, Jr., United States Representative from Illinois
Alexi Giannoulias, Illinois State Treasurer
Tom Harkin, United States Senator from Iowa
John Hickenlooper, Mayor of Denver
Dan Hynes, State Comptroller of Illinois
Emil Jones, Jr., State Senator from Illinois
Nancy Keenan, President of NARAL Pro-Choice America
Jerry Kellman, mentor and friend of Barack Obama
Amy Klobuchar, United States Senator from Minnesota
Jim Leach, Republican former United States Representative from Iowa
Lisa Madigan, Attorney General of Illinois
Patricia Madrid, Attorney General of New Mexico
Doris Matsui, United States Representative from California and Convention Parliamentarian
Claire McCaskill, United States Senator from Missouri
Judith McHale, business executive and co-chair of the Convention Platform Committee
Grace Napolitano,  United States Representative from California
Margie Perez, musician
Silvestre Reyes, United States Representative from Texas
Candi Schmieder, delegate chair of the Iowa County Convention
Kathleen Sebelius, Governor of Kansas
Maya Soetoro-Ng, half-sister of Barack Obama
Andrew Tobias, Democratic Party Treasurer
Reg Weaver, President of the National Education Association
Randi Weingarten, President of the American Federation of Teachers

Tuesday, August 26

The theme for the day was "Renewing America's Promise." Senator Hillary Clinton was the headline prime-time speaker and former Virginia Governor Mark Warner delivered the keynote address on Tuesday night.

Principal speakers
Hillary Clinton, United States Senator from New York, former Congressional and Carter administration lawyer, and former First Lady of the United States; runner-up for the 2008 Democratic nomination
Mark Warner, keynote speaker, former Virginia governor and candidate for United States Senate

Featured speakers
The speakers included:
Tammy Baldwin, United States Representative from Wisconsin
Xavier Becerra, United States Representative from California
Barbara Boxer, United States Senator from California
Anna Burger, chair of the Change to Win Federation
Maria Cantwell, United States Senator from Washington
Bob Casey, Jr., United States Senator from Pennsylvania
John Chiang, State Controller of California
John Conyers, United States Representative from Michigan
Chet Culver, Governor of Iowa
Jim Doyle, Governor of Wisconsin
Rahm Emanuel, United States House of Representatives Democratic Caucus Chair
David Gipp, President of United Tribes Technical College, Bismarck, North Dakota
Jennifer Granholm, Governor of Michigan
Mike Honda, United States Representative from California
Eleanor Holmes Norton, United States Delegate from the District of Columbia
Steny Hoyer, United States Representative from Maryland, House Majority Leader
Carolyn Kilpatrick, United States Representative from Michigan
Amy Klobuchar, United States Senator from Minnesota
Dennis Kucinich, United States Representative from Ohio
Mary Landrieu, United States Senator from Louisiana
Patrick Leahy, United States Senator from Vermont
Lilly Ledbetter, pay equity pioneer
Blanche Lincoln, United States Senator from Arkansas
Joe Manchin, Governor of West Virginia and chair of the Democratic Governors’ Association
Claire McCaskill, United States Senator from Missouri
Barbara Mikulski, United States Senator from Maryland
Nancy Floyd, founder of Nth Power
Janet Napolitano, Governor of Arizona
Deval Patrick, Governor of Massachusetts
Charles Rangel, United States Representative from New York
Ed Rendell, Governor of Pennsylvania
Cecile Richards, President of Planned Parenthood of America
David Paterson, Governor of New York
Federico Peña, former United States Secretary of Energy and United States Secretary of Transportation
Linda Sánchez, United States Representative from California
Brian Schweitzer, Governor of Montana
Kathleen Sebelius, Governor of Kansas
Ted Sorensen, author and advisor to President John F. Kennedy
Debbie Stabenow, United States Senator from Michigan
Ted Strickland, Governor of Ohio
John Sweeney, President of the AFL-CIO
Bennie Thompson, United States Representative from Mississippi
 Chris Van Hollen, chair of the Democratic Congressional Campaign Committee
Nydia Velázquez, United States Representative from New York
Jim Whitaker, Republican mayor of Fairbanks, Alaska

Wednesday, August 27

The theme for the day was "Securing America's Future" and featured a speech by Joe Biden, the Vice Presidential candidate. Iraq War veterans Representative Patrick Murphy (D-PA) and Illinois Veterans' Affairs Department Director Tammy Duckworth offered a tribute to war veterans.

Obama and Biden were both formally chosen to be the Democratic nominees for President and Vice President by acclamation, put forward by former rival Senator Hillary Clinton.

Barack Obama himself made a surprise appearance after Biden's acceptance speech and praised the performances of his colleagues and his wife Michelle. Obama also reminded delegates to attend his acceptance speech the following day.

Sister Catherine Pinkerton delivered the benediction for the night.

Principal speakers
Joe Biden, United States Senator from Delaware and 2008 Democratic nominee for Vice President of the United States
Bill Clinton, 42nd President of the United States

Featured speakers
The speakers included:
Madeleine Albright, former United States Secretary of State
Tom Allen, candidate for United States Senate from Maine
Evan Bayh, United States Senator from Indiana
Beau Biden, Attorney General of Delaware and son of Joe Biden
Lois Capps, United States Representative from California
Kathy Castor, United States Representative from Florida
James E. Clyburn, United States House of Representatives Majority Whip
Elijah Cummings, United States Representative from Maryland
Richard M. Daley, Mayor of Chicago
Tom Daschle, former United States Senator from South Dakota
Artur Davis, United States Representative from Alabama
Rosa DeLauro, United States Representative from Connecticut
Manny Diaz, mayor of Miami
Tammy Duckworth, Iraq War veteran and Director of Illinois Veterans' Affairs
Chet Edwards, United States Representative from Texas
John Hutson, Republican, retired rear admiral of the United States Navy and president of the Franklin Pierce Law Center
Michele S. Jones, first female command sergeant major of the United States Army
Claudia J. Kennedy, first female three-star general in the United States Army
John Kerry, United States Senator from Massachusetts and 2004 Democratic presidential nominee
Nita Lowey, United States Representative from New York
Jeff Merkley, candidate for United States Senate from Oregon
Patrick Murphy, United States Representative from Pennsylvania and first Iraq War veteran elected to Congress
Nancy Pelosi, Speaker of the United States House of Representatives
Jack Reed, United States Senator from Rhode Island
Harry Reid, United States Senate Majority Leader
Jay Rockefeller, United States Senator from West Virginia
Xiomara Rodriguez, Nevada delegate and retired member of the United States Coast Guard
Ken Salazar, United States Senator from Colorado
Joe Sestak, United States Representative from Pennsylvania
Chuck Schumer, United States Senator from New York
Jeanne Shaheen, former governor of New Hampshire and candidate for United States Senate
Louise Slaughter, United States Representative from New York
Hilda Solis, United States Representative from California
Tom Udall, United States Representative from New Mexico and candidate for United States Senate
Debbie Wasserman Schultz, United States Representative from Florida
Maxine Waters, United States Representative from California
Robert Wexler, United States Representative from Florida

Results of delegate voting
Along with presumptive presidential nominee Barack Obama, former opponent Hillary Clinton's name was also placed in nomination for president. The Los Angeles Times noted that this has occurred before: Jerry Brown's name was entered into the roll call after losing to Bill Clinton in 1992; Jesse Jackson and Gary Hart also had their names added after losing to Walter F. Mondale in 1984. In 1980, Senator Ted Kennedy's name was entered into the roll call after losing to Jimmy Carter. In addition, Clinton became only the fourth woman to have her name placed in nomination for president at a major party convention. U.S. Sen. Margaret Chase Smith of Maine was placed in nomination at the 1964 Republican convention, and U.S. Rep. Shirley Chisholm of New York was placed in nomination at the 1972 Democratic convention. In 1976, anti-abortionist  Ellen McCormack had her name placed in nomination along with Mo Udall,  Jimmy Carter and Jerry Brown.

President

Obama was formally selected as the Democratic nominee through acclamation, put forward by formal rival Senator Hillary Clinton of New York, offering her own delegates to Obama and motioning to suspend the rules of the roll call.

Vice president
Joe Biden was nominated by acclamation on a voice vote.

Thursday, August 28

The theme for the day was "Change You Can Believe In."

Barack Obama accepted the nomination in a speech at INVESCO Field at Mile High on the 45th anniversary of Martin Luther King Jr.'s "I Have a Dream" speech.

Rabbi David Saperstein gave an invocation prior to Obama's speech.  Progressive pastor Joel Hunter offered the benediction after Obama's speech. Speaker Pelosi adjourned the convention after the benediction.

Principal speakers
Al Gore, 45th Vice President of the United States
Barack Obama, United States Senator from Illinois

Featured speakers
Howard Dean, chair of the Democratic National Committee
Diana DeGette, United States Representative from Colorado
Dick Durbin, United States Senator from Illinois
Susan Eisenhower, granddaughter of President Dwight D. Eisenhower
J. Scott Gration, retired Major General of the United States Air Force
Luis Gutierrez, United States Representative from Illinois
Tim Kaine, Governor of Virginia
Bernice King, daughter of Martin Luther King, Jr.
Martin Luther King III, eldest son of Martin Luther King, Jr.
John Lewis, United States Representative from Georgia
Ed Perlmutter, United States Representative from Colorado
David Plouffe, Obama campaign manager
Bill Richardson, Governor of New Mexico
Bill Ritter, Governor of Colorado
Ray Rivera, Obama state director of Colorado
John Salazar, United States Representative from Colorado
Jan Schakowsky, United States Representative from Illinois
Mark Udall, United States Representative from Colorado and candidate for United States Senate

Live performances
Jennifer Hudson
will.i.am, accompanied by John Legend (piano), Agape Choir, and band
Sheryl Crow A Change Would Do You Good / Out Of Our Heads / Everyday Is A Winding Road Interlude I Can See Clearly Now
Stevie Wonder
Michael McDonald
Yonder Mountain String Band

Other
Shawn Johnson, Olympic gymnast, recited the Pledge of Allegiance

Notes

External links
 Official Convention Website
 Denver 2008 Host Committee (official)
 Democratic Convention Bloggers Group Blog
 Denver DNC information and forums
 Democratic National Convention news coverage: Rocky Mountain News, Denver Post